is a common feminine Japanese given name.

Possible writings
Eri can be written using different kanji characters and can mean:
恵理, "blessing, reason"
絵里, "picture, hometown"
絵梨, "picture, pear"
絵理, "picture, reason"
江里, "inlet, hometown"
恵里, "blessing, hometown"
恵利, "blessing, profit"
江利, "inlet, profit"
恵梨, "blessing, pear"
枝里, "branch, hometown"
英梨, "excel, pear"
英里, "excel, hometown"
愛利, "love, clever"
愛理, “loving reason”
The name can also be written in hiragana or katakana.

People with the name
Eri Fukatsu (絵里, born 1973), Japanese actress
Eri Ishida (born 1960), Japanese actress
Eri Itō (恵里), Japanese vocalist
Eri Kamei (絵里, born 1988), member of the Japanese pop group Morning Musume
Eri Kawai (英里, 1965–2008), Japanese singer
Eri Kikuchi (born 1965), 1980s Japanese AV idol
, Japanese swimmer
Eri Kitamura (英梨, born 1987), Japanese voice actress and singer
Eri Murakawa (絵梨, born 1987), Japanese actress
, Japanese speed skater
Eri Nitta (恵利, born 1968), Japanese idol and singer
Eri Nobuchika (エリ, born 1985), Japanese pop singer and songwriter
Eri Sendai (born 1981), Japanese voice actress
Eri Shingyōji (恵里, born 1974), Japanese rock singer
Eri Tokunaga (born 1962), Japanese politician and former TV reporter
Eri Tokunaga (actress) (born 1988), Japanese actress
Eri Uchinaga (内永 枝利, born 2000) stage name Giselle, Japanese-Korean member of South Korean girl group Aespa
, Japanese softball player
Eri Yamaguchi (衛里, born 1973), Japanese long-distance runner
Eri Yamanoi (絵理, born 1978), Japanese former freestyle swimmer
Eri Yanetani (born 1984), Japanese snowboarder
, Japanese baseball player
, Japanese voice actress

Fictional characters
Eri (絵理), a character in the manga series InuYasha
Eri (My Hero Academia), a character in the manga series My Hero Academia
Eri Minami, Yuuta's step-mother in the game Persona 4
Eri Kasamoto (エリ), a playable character in the game series Metal Slug
Eri Kasuga, a character from anime and manga Chimpui
Eri Kisaki, Ran's mother in the manga series Detective Conan
Eri Sawachika (愛理), in the anime and manga series School Rumble
Eri Miyanoshita (宮ノ下), a character in manga series Haikyū!!.
Eri Takigawa (エリ), in the Japanese television drama Last Friends
Eri, in the manga adaptation of Candy Boy
Eri Ninamori, in the anime series FLCL
Eri Asai, in Haruki Murakami's novel After Dark
Eri Shina, in the anime Angel Beats!
Eri Ayase, one of the nine main characters from the anime Love Live! School Idol Project
Eri Karan, a character from Digimon Universe: Appli Monsters

References

Japanese feminine given names